Gedaged is an Austronesian language spoken by about 7000 people in coastal villages and on islands in Astrolabe Bay, Madang Province, Papua New Guinea.

External links 
 Materials on Gedaged are included in the open access Arthur Capell collections (AC2) held by Paradisec.

References

Languages of Madang Province
Bel languages